Simranjit Singh Mann (born 20 May 1945) is a Punjabi and Indian politician and MP representing the constituency of Sangrur since 2022. He is the president of the political party Shiromani Akali Dal (Amritsar). Mann is a three-time MP; once from Taran Tarn between 1989 and 1991, and twice in Sangrur between 1999-2004 and since 2022.

Early life
Simranjt Singh Mann was born in Shimla on 20 May 1945. His father Joginder Singh Mann, was a speaker of the Punjab Vidhan Sabha in 1967.

Mann was educated at the Bishop Cotton School, Shimla and Government College Chandigarh. He was a gold medalist in the subjects of "History", "Punjabi", "Religion" and "Political Science".

Indian Police Service
Mann joined the Indian Police Service in 1967, and served in the Punjab Cadre of the Service.

He served as Aide-de-camp (ADC) to the Governor of Punjab. He was also posted as a police officer in several districts. He served in several positions, including ASP Ludhiana, SSP Ferozepur, SSP Faridkot,  AIG GRP Punjab-Patiala division, deputy director of Vigilance Bureau Chandigarh, Commandant of Punjab Armed Police and Group Commandant of CISF, Bombay.

He resigned from Indian Police Service on 18 June 1984 in protest of Operation Blue Star. In July 1984 he was dismissed from IPS.

Political career 
He was charged with the conspiracy to assassinate Indira Gandhi. He was arrested on 29 November 1984 and spent five years in Bhagalpur prison.

He was elected as the president of the new party United Shiromani Akali Dal.

Due to his 1984 Political involvements he won 1989 Lok sabha elections from Tarn Taran (Lok Sabha constituency) in absentia with their 6 other candidates on Shiromani Akali Dal (Amritsar) ticket and 3 other candidates also won backed by them.
Afterwards he won 1999 Lok Sabha elections from Sangrur Lok Sabha constituency. He also won 1996, 2004 SGPC elections from Bassi Pathana.

Member of Parliament in Lok Sabha

1989–1991
He was elected in absentia to the Lok Sabha representing the constituency of Tarn Taran by an overwhelming majority, and unconditionally released  "in the interests of the State" in November 1989, with all charges dropped. By this time he had spent five years in prison.

In 1990, Mann insisted on bearing his Kirpan (small sword) into the Parliament session, a religious rite in the Sikh Faith. The security regulations of the Parliament did not allow arms into the house. Accordingly, was denied entry into the Sansad Bhavan (Parliament house) with the weapon. Mann decided to not attend the Parliament. He subsequently resigned his seat in protest.

1999-2004
On 3 November 1999, after Mann was elected to the Lok Sabha by winning in the Sangrur Lok Sabha constituency, the Punjab and Haryana High Court ordered the Government of India and the Passport Office in Chandigarh to issue a passport to him.

On 23 March 2004, Prakash Singh Badal accused Mann of running derogatory ads against him and indulging in character assassination.

He contested for re-election in the 2004 Indian general election from Sangrur constituency but lost the election and came on third position.

He remained the president of the SAD (Amritsar) party for eighteen years. In the 2007 Punjab Legislative Assembly election SAD (Amritsar) contested on 60 seats. Radical organization Dal Khalsa (International) had supported candidates of SAD (Amritsar). Mann had contested from Dhanaula Assembly constituency and his son Emaan Singh Mann contested from Sirhind. All the 60 candidates including Mann lost the election with big margins. Most candidates of SAD (Amritsar) had lost their security deposit in the election. Mann offered to resign after his party's poor performance.

2022-present
In the 2022 Punjab Legislative Assembly election, he lost to Jaswant Singh Gajjanmajra of the Aam Aadmi Party in the Amargarh Assembly Constituency.

In June 2022, he won the by-poll for the Sangrur Lok Sabha constituency vacated by then MP, Bhagwant Mann, who went to become Chief Minister of Punjab, Mann won the election by a margin of 5,822 votes. During the election he campaigned for the release of Sikh prisoners.
 His grandson was in-charge of his election campaign.

In August 2022, he objected to President Droupadi Murmu being referred to as the name "Rashtrapati". He said, "I strongly believe Rashtrapati word is an insult to a woman President." His comments were expunged from the records of the parliament. He asked for elections in the Shiromani Gurdwara Parbandhak Committee (SGPC), the apex religious body of Sikhs.

Political positions

Khalistan
Mann is a proponent of Sikh nation state Khalistan. Under his leadership, his party SAD (A) continued its position of creating Khalistan as a buffer state between India and Pakistan.  Under him, SAD (A) continued spreading the ideology of Jarnail Singh Bhindranwale.

Every year his supporters gather in the sacred Golden Temple and raise pro-Khalistan slogans. He dedicated his 2022 Lok Sabha election victory to the Khalistan separatist leader Jarnail Singh Bhindranwale.

Bhagat Singh
In 2007, Mann had called freedom fighter Bhagat Singh, a "petty terrorist". A lawsuit was filed against him, but the prosecution failed to prove its case and he was acquitted by the civil court in 2013. After his release, Mann said, "My acquittal has vindicated my words that Bhagat Singh was a terrorist and not a martyr."

In 2015, he objected to naming the Chandigarh airport after Bhagat Singh and called him a terrorist. He had said, "Bhagat Singh is neither a martyr nor a national hero. He is a terrorist. We are against the naming of Chandigarh International airport as Shaheed-E-Azam Sardar Bhagat Singh Airport."

In 2022, he called Bhagat Singh "a terrorist" involved in "terror activities in pre-Independent India". AAP leaders condemned the statement and asked him to apologize. Residents of Khatkar Kalan, Bhagat Singh's native village protested near the Bhagat Singh Museum, shouted slogans of "Death to Simranjit Singh Mann", hit his effigy with shoes and burnt it.

General Reginald Dyer
In 1919, after General Reginald Dyer's Jallianwala Bagh massacre, Mann's maternal grandfather Arur Singh, then sarbarah (in-charge) of the Golden Temple had honoured General Dyer with a "siropa" at Akal Takht. Singh was a British government appointee. Arur Singh's act hurt Sikh psyche and is considered a "Black chapter" in Sikh history. In July 2022, Mann defended the act of his grandfather saying he did it to pacify Dyer's anger.

Family 
Mann is married to Geetinder Kaur, who is a sister of Preneet Kaur, the wife of former Punjab CM Amarinder Singh. The couple have a son and two daughters.

Electoral performance

See also 

 Parkash Singh Badal
 Captain Amarinder Singh

References

Living people
1945 births
India MPs 1999–2004
India MPs 1989–1991
Lok Sabha members from Punjab, India
Shiromani Akali Dal politicians
People from Shimla
Indian Sikhs
People from Sangrur district
India MPs 2019–present
Bishop Cotton School Shimla alumni